Ethel Afamado (born 25 April 1940) is a Uruguayan composer, poet, guitarist, and singer-songwriter.

Biography
Ethel Afamado's musical background includes studies of violin, bassoon, singing, guitar, and composition. Particularly interested in traditional Sephardic music, she has compiled material and given several recitals to showcase these old songs. She has created music for over 100 poems by Uruguayan and Hispanoamerican authors, performing numerous recitals in song with guitar accompaniment.

Afamado has also composed songs for plays, including those by Cervantes, Florencio Sánchez, and Federico García Lorca. From 1987 to 1997 she presented her recital Canción e imagen as a soloist with her sister Gladys Afamado. She has presented, among others, the recitals Mujeres, sus voces, en mi voz, Caminos de la palabra, and Canciones para sentir. She performed the show titled Canto y poesía alongside actress , and Mujeres sus voces nuestra voz with poet Lourdes Peruchena.

In 1993 she participated in the poet 's Ágape cassette, with three of his musicalizations. In 1997 she again took part in Ágape, this time released on disc.

Awards and recognition
 2001 – at the invitation of the Chamber of Representatives, took part in the event honoring Juana de Ibarbourou at the Legislative Palace
 2002 – Lolita Rubial Foundation National Grand Prize for the short story "La volqueta"

References

1940 births
Living people
20th-century Uruguayan poets
21st-century Uruguayan poets
Women guitarists
Women singer-songwriters
Singers from Montevideo
Uruguayan singer-songwriters
Uruguayan composers
Uruguayan guitarists
Uruguayan women poets
Writers from Montevideo
21st-century Uruguayan women writers
20th-century Uruguayan women writers